Theodor "Tedde" Mauritz Forselius (born 23 March 1995) is a Swedish computer programmer and internet entrepreneur from Jönköping, Sweden. He is best known as the co-founder and Chief Executive Officer of Everipedia.

Career 
In December 2014, Theodor Forselius co-founded Everipedia. They built the first version of the website in Kazemian's college dormitory room at UCLA.

Since then, Forselius and Everipedia have been internationally recognized in publications such as Wired Magazine. He has also been featured on the front pages of local publications in Sweden such as Veckans Affärer and Dagens Industri.

References

1995 births
Swedish computer programmers
21st-century Swedish inventors
Swedish philanthropists
Swedish technology company founders
Businesspeople in software
Living people